Bruce Green is an American film editor known for his work with directors such as Garry Marshall, Mark Waters, and Jon Turteltaub. Trained by editor Michael Kahn, he was the first assistant editor on Raiders of the Lost Ark and Indiana Jones and the Temple of Doom. He was in the visual effects department of Star Wars Episode IV: A New Hope.

Green began his career editing Friday the 13th films, including Friday the 13th: A New Beginning and Friday the 13th Part VI: Jason Lives. Later, he edited films such as Cool Runnings, The Princess Diaries and Freaky Friday. He has also worked in television, editing Jane the Virgin.

Bruce was on the board of directors of the Motion Picture Editors Guild, Hollywood.

Filmography

References

External links

American film editors
Living people
Year of birth missing (living people)
Place of birth missing (living people)